Tlillan-Tlapallan  'Place of the black and red colour' is a legendary place or region on the Gulf Coast of Mexico where king Quetzalcoatl went on his flight from Tollan in order to burn himself and change into the Morning Star.

The tale can be found in an important 16th-century manuscript (the Codex Chimalpopoca) containing the Annals of Quauhtitlan. Written in Nahua, the text basically translates a pre-Spanish book. The tale also occurs in Bernardino de Sahagún's General History of the Things of New Spain. The name Tlillan Tlapallan has been interpreted as referring to writing and books.

References

External links
 https://web.archive.org/web/20071020222852/http://weber.ucsd.edu/~anthclub/quetzalcoatl/que.htm

Locations in Aztec mythology
Locations in Mesoamerican mythology